Shojaabad (also Romanized as Shojā‘ābād) is a village in Misheh Pareh Rural District, in the Central District of Kaleybar County, East Azerbaijan Province, Iran. At the 2006 census, its population was 73, in 21 families.

Situation
Online edition of the Dehkhoda Dictionary, quoting Iranian Army files, reports a population of 67 people in late 1940s. At the 2006 census, its population was 73, in 21 families.  According to a more recent statistics (2012) the population is 80 people in 22 families.

Due to the proximity to Babak Fort the village is already experiencing a rapid growth.

References 

Populated places in Kaleybar County